Another Man's Boots is a 1922 American silent Western film directed by William James Craft and starring Francis Ford, Bob Kortman and Frank Lanning.

Cast
 Francis Ford as The Stranger
 Elvira Weil as Nell Hadley
 Harry Smith as Ned Hadley
 Bob Kortman as Sly Stevens 
 Frank Lanning as Injun Jim

References

External links
 

1922 films
1922 Western (genre) films
American black-and-white films
Films directed by William James Craft
Silent American Western (genre) films
1920s English-language films
1920s American films